Boris Baran is a Canadian bridge player.

Bridge accomplishments

Wins

 World Senior Teams Championship (1) 2002
 North American Bridge Championships (5)
 North American Pairs (1) 1991 
 Keohane North American Swiss Teams (4) 1992, 1994, 1995, 2002

Runners-up

 Bermuda Bowl (1) 1995 
 North American Bridge Championships (2)
 North American Pairs (1) 1990 
 Keohane North American Swiss Teams (1) 1998

Notes

External links
 

Canadian contract bridge players
Bermuda Bowl players
Living people
Year of birth missing (living people)